Ancylosis trimaculella is a species of snout moth in the genus Ancylosis. It was described by Daniel Lucas in 1943 and is known from Tunisia.

References

Moths described in 1943
trimaculella
Endemic fauna of Tunisia
Moths of Africa